Dublar Char is an island in Bangladesh with an area of 66.5 km2, located in the Bagerhat District of the Khulna Division. It's a tourist destination inside Sundarban. Only Teletalk Internet & Mobile Network is available here. Fisherman live here during fishing season for three to four months and who have demanded a floating hospital from the Government of Bangladesh. The island hosts a Raas Mela (fair) annually.

Economy 
Dublar Char is the largest dry fish processing site in the Sundarban region. Labor activists have accused the fishermen of using child labor on the island. On 8 November 2004, Bangladesh Coast Guard rescued 93 boys between the ages of 7 and 12 who were used as slave labor by the fishermen.

There is only a market in dublar char named Dublar Char New market

Banking and telecommunication 
Here there is no branch of bank. But mobile banking agents of bKash, nagad, SureCash & TeleTalk TelePay is available.
Mobile banking agents run their business based on Teletalk Network because Only Teletalk Internet & Mobile Network available here.

See also
 List of islands of Bangladesh

References

Islands of Bangladesh
Islands of the Bay of Bengal
Populated places in Bangladesh